Federico Caricasulo (born 6 April 1996 in Ravenna) is an Italian motorcycle racer. He has raced in the European Superstock 600 Championship, the Moto2 World Championship and the Supersport World Championship. He was the CIV Supersport champion in 2014.

Career statistics

Grand Prix motorcycle racing

By season

Races by year
(key) (Races in bold indicate pole position; races in italics indicate fastest lap)

Supersport World Championship

Races by year
(key) (Races in bold indicate pole position; races in italics indicate fastest lap)

* Season still in progress.

Superbike World Championship

Races by year
(key) (Races in bold indicate pole position; races in italics indicate fastest lap)

References

External links

1996 births
Living people
Italian motorcycle racers
Moto2 World Championship riders
Supersport World Championship riders
Sportspeople from Ravenna
Superbike World Championship riders